Stamatis Kalamiotis (born on 23 April 1990) is a Greek footballer who last played for Aiolikos in the Football League (Greece) as a  defender.

Career
Born in Athens, Kalamiotis began playing football for local side AEK Athens. He made his debut for AEK in October 2010 in the Greek Cup against Panthrakikos.

Honours
AEK Athens
Greek Cup: 2010–11

References

External links
Profile at Onsports.gr

1990 births
Living people
Footballers from Athens
Greek footballers
AEK Athens F.C. players
Niki Volos F.C. players
Thrasyvoulos F.C. players
Kallithea F.C. players
Association football central defenders